Heads or Tails refers to coin flipping.

Heads or Tails may also refer to:

Film
 Heads or Tails (1937 film), or Águila o sol, a Mexican film
 Heads or Tails (1969 film), or Testa o croce, an Italian western film
 Heads or Tails?, or Bomma Borusa, a 1971 Indian Telugu-language comedy film 
 Heads or Tails (1982 film), or Testa o croce, or Heads I Win, Tails You Lose, an Italian comedy film 
 Heads or Tails, or Pismo - Glava, a 1983 drama film by Bahrudin Čengić
 Heads or Tails (1997 film), or J'en suis!, a Canadian film
 Heads or Tails (2005 film), an American drama

Other uses
 Heads or Tails, a 2010 British TV game show hosted by Justin Lee Collins
 Heads or Tails?, a 2005 music album by Sowelu

See also
Heads and Tails (disambiguation)
Heads and Tales (disambiguation)
Obverse and reverse